Virata Corporation is an inactive acquired company that was a major contributor to the "Cambridge Phenomenon" or Silicon Fen high-tech cluster in the United Kingdom. Case studies and research papers have been created to illustrate the role of social networking in the creation of Virata's success. There is also research available on the role the company played in Silicon Valley venture networks.

The company was originally founded by Andy Hopper and Hermann Hauser in 1993 as Advanced Telecommunication Modules Ltd, and in February 1998 the company changed its name to Virata Limited. The choice of name derived from a product family name used by ATML, but it was also derived from an Italian verb meaning "to change course" as used in the nautical context of "tacking" - making progress against a prevailing headwind.

A typical product is the Helium 210-80 launched in August 2001.

On May 25, 2001, the company opened a new European headquarters on the Cambridge Science Park. A new building of 2,884 sq. metres (31,000sq ft) provided accommodation for over 90 staff, 3 lab areas (Chip Lab, Hardware Lab and Systems Test Lab) and a customer training suite. It also had a boardroom with a now-infamous table in the shape of a "V" and a presenter's podium in the shape of the "dot" over the "i" in the Virata logo.

GlobespanVirata continued to be the market leader in the DSL semiconductor market in 2002 with revenues of $226 million and 28% revenue market share.

In an effort to reduce operating costs GlobespanVirata embarked on a series of site closures and employee headcount reduction. In August 2002, it closed the Raleigh and Maynard offices, for example, and there were lay-offs at most sites.

References 

Companies based in Cambridge
Companies established in 1993
Companies formerly listed on the Nasdaq
Fabless semiconductor companies
Semiconductor companies of the United Kingdom